Polyporus tuberaster is a species of fungus in the genus Polyporus.

The yellow-brown cap is 4–15 cm wide, and ranges from convex to flat and even funnel-shaped. The whitish stalks can grow upwards of 10 cm high and 2–4 cm wide. The spores are white.

The species is edible but also tough.

References

External links
 
 

tuberaster
Edible fungi
Fungi described in 1821